Kanhaipur or Kanaipur in Bengali can refer to

Kanhaipur, Uttar Pradesh
Kanhaipur, East Bengal 
Kanhaipur, West Bengal